The Song of the Suburbs (Spanish:La canción de los barrios) is a 1941 Argentine musical film directed by Luis César Amadori and starring Aída Alberti, Alicia Vignoli and Hugo del Carril.

Cast
 Aída Alberti
 Alicia Vignoli
 Hugo del Carril
 Francisco Álvarez
 Arturo Bamio 
 Cirilo Etulain 
 Eliseo Herrero 
 Adolfo Meyer 
 Fausto Padín 
 José Antonio Paonessa 
 Joaquín Petrocino 
 Elvira Quiroga 
 Julio Renato 
 Jorge Villoldo

References

Bibliography 
 Rist, Peter H. Historical Dictionary of South American Cinema. Rowman & Littlefield, 2014.

External links
 

1941 films
Argentine musical drama films
1940s Spanish-language films
Argentine black-and-white films
1940s musical drama films
Tango films
Films directed by Luis César Amadori
1941 drama films
1940s Argentine films